Marco Antonio Luisito Villanueva Sardillo III is a Filipino government official who previous served as the ninth Administrator of the Intramuros Administration, an attached agency of the Department of Tourism mandated with the authority to restore and guide the development of Intramuros, Manila. Prior to his appointment as Administrator of Intramuros, Sardillo was the executive director of the Presidential Commission on Good Government from 2010 to 2012.

References

Living people
Ateneo de Manila University alumni
Year of birth missing (living people)